Akpabio is a surname. Notable people with the surname include:

George Akpabio (born 1992), Nigerian footballer
Godswill Akpabio (born 1962), Nigerian lawyer and politician

Surnames of Nigerian origin